RUT may refer to:

 Registro Único Tributario, the Colombian unique taxpayer identification number
 Rol Único Tributario, the Chilean taxation unique contributor roll identification number
 Rutland, county in England, Chapman code
 Rutland Railroad, a former railroad in the northeastern United States
 Rutland–Southern Vermont Regional Airport (IATA code), a state-owned public-use airport located in North Clarendon, Vermont
 Rutherglen railway station (station code), a railway station that serves Rutherglen, South Lanarkshire, Scotland

See also
 Rut (disambiguation)